Obelisk Movements is the second studio album by American hip hop duo Micranots, consisting of rapper I Self Devine and producer DJ Kool Akiem. It was released October 31, 2000 on Sub Verse Music.

Music 
The album is mostly produced by DJ Kool Akiem, with one track produced by Ogami Don Itto. Guest appearances include Buddah Tye, Marq Spekt, Stahhr, Brane, Ekundayo, Luz, Maat Ra and Saber.

Track listing 
All tracks are produced by DJ Kool Akiem except where noted.

References

External links 
 Obelisk Movements at Discogs

2000 albums
Micranots albums